+30 mg is the debut extended play (EP) by band Cruel Youth, released on 16 September 2016 by Disgrace Records.

Background
Following their termination from the New Zealand version of The X Factor in 2015, Teddy Sinclair and Willy Moon relocated to the United States. Over the year they began to experiment with music, ultimately resurfacing as Cruel Youth. Their first release was "Mr. Watson", which was uploaded to the band's SoundCloud in February 2016. The song was later released as a single, following "Diamond Days", and a video for the single was released in June 2016. Following the video, Sinclair announced the band would be releasing an EP later that year. On 7 September, the band released the single "Hatefuck" and announced the EP would be released on 16 September. The following day, the official album art was released. In a statement to fans, Sinclair wrote:

Finally, after months of playing and perfecting, our EP +30mg is complete! And now we want you to hear it...

With the EP comes our latest single, "Hatefuck", a buzzing ballad I wrote about some of my very lowest moments. Of all the drugs, love is the worst. It seems to come with a set of handcuffs but no key. Some people hit rock bottom, some people crash right through and keep falling down - that was me, and if what came out of it was this song then it was certainly worth it. I hope it means as much to you as it does to us.

Singles
The EP was preceded by three singles. The lead single "Diamond Days" was released on 15 April 2016. "Mr. Watson" was released as the second single on 20 May 2016. The third single "Hatefuck" was released on 7 September 2016.

Track listing

References

2016 debut EPs
Cruel Youth albums